Étienne Doué  is a Grower Champagne producer  located in the commune of Montgueux in the Aube  region of Champagne. 
The soils  contain  clay, as well as  hard limestone, limestone, and some chalk. 
The grapes are hand-harvested, and vinified in stainless steel; no oak is used.  All Étienne Doué white wines undergo malolactic conversion. The wines are  lightly filtered but not fined.

References

External links

Champagne producers